Young Apprentice is a British reality television programme and a spin off of The Apprentice, in which a group of young people compete against each other in a series of business related challenges to win a £25,000 investment from British business magnate Lord Sugar. In addition to Sugar, he was also joined by his adviser Nick Hewer, and new adviser Karren Brady, prior to her debut on the main show, upon Margaret Mountford's departure from the role in 2009.

Premiering on 12 May 2010, the show ran for three series on both BBC One and BBC HD, before it was cancelled by the BBC, after they decided not to renew it after its third series. The programme was met with mostly positive reviews from critics during its broadcast.

History

In March 2008, Alan Sugar made an announcement that he intended to propose to the BBC of creating a junior version of The Apprentice owing to its success, with the intention that it would feature children aged between 12-15 and be aired during an early evening timeslot. He later claimed that "nobody took any notice" of his suggestions. A year later, Sugar announced that he had begun negotiations with the BBC in regards to the concept he proposed - this included a focus on the winning team in episodes; a gentler handling of young candidates; the inclusion of his advisers in the spin-off; and airing on BBC One with a similar format structure to that of the main show, though with no use of the Interviews stage of the contest. Official confirmation that the idea had been green-lighted and production was underway on the spin-off, came in the form of announcement made during an episode of The Apprentice: You're Fired! covering the fifth series of the main show, on 20 May 2009, for applicants for the new show. Part of the announcement revealed that the initial concept for the age group of applicants had changed during negotiation, with it now being focused on those between 16–17 years old, from a variety of social and educational backgrounds, with the announcement inviting potential applicants to visit the official The Apprentice website to apply for the spin-off. Sugar remarked that the series, originally announced to be a five-part series, aimed to "promote enterprise amongst young people, as the future of our economy relies on them". In response to this announcement, 28,000 teenagers applied for the show, with ten selected to take part in the competition. After talks about its creation, the show's executive producers were chosen to be Jo Wallace for the BBC, Mark Burnett and C. Scot Cru for Mark Burnett Productions, and Sue Davidson and Michele Kurland for Talkback Thames.

A few months later, Sugar's appointment to be the Labour Party's Enterprise Tsar on 5 June 2009, accompanied by a peerage, led to concerns by the BBC over a conflict of interest in regards to the corporation's political impartiality; while it was decreed that he would continue to appear on The Apprentice and related programming, following discussions on the matter, it was decided to push back the premiere of the spin-off show, dubbed Junior Apprentice, along with the sixth series of the main show, until after the 2010 general election on 6 May 2010. In addition to this, Margaret Mountford's departure from the role of an adviser in The Apprentice, led to Sugar appointing Karren Brady as her replacement, with the decision that she would make her debut in the spin-off. On 3 May 2010, the BBC finally announced the premiere date for the show, which began airing its first series on 12 May 2010.

After concluding its first series, the BBC announced on 28 August 2010 that it had commissioned a second series of the programme, though this came with a few changes - the number of young candidates was increased to twelve, leading to the number of episodes being increased to eight; and the show's title was changed to Young Apprentice. The second series began airing from 24 October 2011; during its broadcast, the BBC commissioned a third series and began conducting applications for it. On 30 August 2012, it was reportedly claimed that Lord Sugar had axed the show due to declining ratings and his desire to concentrate on the main show, but Sugar later stated on his Twitter account that these reports were incorrect, yet he could not confirm how long the spin-off had; the third series eventually began airing a few months later, on 1 November 2012. In February 2013, Lord Sugar posted on his Twitter account that the BBC was cancelling the show, after having debated on its future and decided not to renew it for another series.

Format

While the spin-off's format is very similar to that of The Apprentice, it adopts a more gentle tone with the young candidates, in contrast to the approach given to older candidates on the main show. As with the main show, applicants go through a series of open auditions and interviews, before being whittled down to the final number that will be involved in the competition, which consists of a balanced number of boys and girls. Throughout the process, the candidates, divided into two teams that they at the beginning of the competition, take part in a series of business-related tasks, appointing one member of their team as the project manager (PM), with Lord Sugar having Brady and Hewer overseeing the team's performance on each task, while providing the candidates with an upmarket house/apartment to live in during the competition; unlike the main show, the young candidates do not partake in a series of Interviews in the penultimate stage of the contest.

Once a task is over, the teams return to the boardroom, and go through the same process as in the main show: an initial review of each team's performance is given, followed by a result of their overall effort; the losing team faces a deeper review of their performance; and a final boardroom session is held, with the young candidates involved in it giving reasons and arguments over why they should remain in the process. Unlike the main show, the fired candidate does not get filmed riding a taxi, but instead rides back home in Sugar's limo, and also do not wear an overcoat and carry their suitcase with them when they board the vehicle. The final episode functions in the same manner, with the finalists being able to pick candidates that were eliminated in the contest to be a part of their team and help them to win the contest, with the winner chosen by Lord Sugar; in both the first and third series, the final featured four candidates, and so adopted a similar approach to that of the final episode of the fourth series of The Apprentice, in that they were divided into two teams, with the losing team being fired, before Sugar debated on which of the two in the winning team that he "hired".

Series 1 (2010)
The first series began airing on 12 May 2010. Ten young candidates took part, and the teams were named "Instinct" and "Revolution", with Arjun Rajyagor winning the series.

Candidates

Performance Chart

 The candidate won this series of Junior Apprentice.
 The candidate was the runner-up.
 The candidate won as project manager on his/her team, for this task.
 The candidate lost as project manager on his/her team, for this task.
 The candidate was on the winning team for this task.
 The candidate was on the losing team for this task.
 The candidate was brought to the final boardroom for this task.
 The candidate was fired in this task.
 The candidate lost as project manager and was fired in this task.
 The candidate left the competition prior to this task.

Episode summary

<onlyinclude>

Series 2 (2011)
The second series began airing on 24 October 2011. Twelve candidates took part in this series, and the teams were named "Atomic" and "Kinetic", with Zara Brownless winning the series.

Candidates

Performance Chart

 The candidate won this series of Junior Apprentice.
 The candidate was the runner-up.
 The candidate won as project manager on his/her team, for this task.
 The candidate lost as project manager on his/her team, for this task.
 The candidate was on the winning team for this task/ in Week 7, they won a place in the Final.
 The candidate was on the losing team for this task.
 The candidate was brought to the final boardroom for this task.
 The candidate was fired in this task.
 The candidate lost as project manager and was fired in this task.
 The candidate was on the winning team, but was fired in this task.

Episode summary

<onlyinclude>

Series 3 (2012)
The third and final series began airing on 1 November 2012. Twelve candidates took part, and the teams were named "Odyssey" and "Platinum", with Ashleigh Porter-Exley winning the series.

Candidates

Performance Chart

 The candidate won this series of Junior Apprentice.
 The candidate was the runner-up.
 The candidate won as project manager on his/her team, for this task.
 The candidate lost as project manager on his/her team, for this task.
 The candidate was on the winning team for this task.
 The candidate was on the losing team for this task.
 The candidate was brought to the final boardroom for this task.
 The candidate was fired in this task.
 The candidate lost as project manager and was fired in this task.

Episode summary

<onlyinclude>

Reception

Critical response
Young Apprentice received a generally positive response from critics. Writing for The Guardian, Tim Lusher was complimentary of the programme's tone by claiming that "for once, even the losers look as if they could be winners one day" and Alex Fletcher of Digital Spy said that from the opening minutes of the first episode it was clear that "this spinoff series isn't going to be any softer or less entertaining than the original". The Daily Telegraphs Benji Wilson also praised the series and argued that it "had all of the staggering self-regard and dim-witted hilarity we have come to expect from the contestants on the grown-up Apprentice". The online version of Heat magazine, heatworld.com, praised the series and said that it was "amazing...might just be the best show we’ve seen all year", while The Guardians Johnny Dee claimed that the programme was of better quality than its adult counterpart and proved that reality television "doesn't have to be nasty to be entertaining".

Despite branding it as "compelling", John Crace of The Guardian claimed that the programme "gave us a first glimpse of the nightmare possibilities of Cameron Youth" and claimed that Sugar's softer approach to the young candidates came across as "unnatural". As well as the character of Zoe Plummer, also seen to be unnatural. In The Independent, Tom Sutcliffe suggested that the sight of crying teenagers would leave the audience feeling uncomfortable. Shortly before the programme started, both the National Federation of Enterprise Agencies and the Institute of Directors criticised the programme's lack of relevancy to business; the former argued that the BBC should instead be focusing on some of Britain's four million small businesses and the latter claimed that the programme should be more informative instead of "entertainment masquerading as business".

In September 2012, it was announced that Young Apprentice was nominated for the 18th National Television Awards in the category Factual Entertainment.

Transmissions

Ratings
Episode viewing figures from BARB.

Series 1

Series 2

Series 3

References

External links
 

The Apprentice (British TV series)
Television shows set in London
2010s British reality television series
2010 British television series debuts
2012 British television series endings
BBC high definition shows
English-language television shows
Reality television spin-offs
Television series about teenagers